Gord Smith  (born October 8, 1937, Montreal) is a Canadian artist who sculpts geometric forms in metal and wood. Smith originally learned to weld with a torch his older brother used to rebuild old cars. He is considered one of Canada's leading sculptors of the post-war period, and his work is marked by a great diversity of styles inspired by music, nature and other themes. Trained in architecture and engineering, he has produced work in metal that reflects a mastery of technique and conveys great flexibility.

Biography

Smith studied architecture at Sir George Williams University from 1956 to 1959. He went on to work with the architectural firm of Lawson Betts and Cash in Montreal from 1956 to 1958. He had originally learned to weld with a torch his older brother used to rebuild old cars. Smith received his first commission from the Fraser-Hickson Library in Montreal at the age of 21. The copper sculpture was erected in 1959 at the north entrance to the library.

Smith, alongside his Post-War contemporaries Yves Trudeau (artist), Armand Vaillancourt and Gerald Gladstone, was testing the possibilities of welded-steel construction in the 1960s.  
In 1967, he was elected to the Royal Canadian Academy of Arts. That same year, he was commissioned to create Canada Screen for the Canadian pavilion at Expo 67. The screen was made of cor-ten steel and measured 110' x 12', approximately weighing 13 tons. The Musée d'art contemporain de Montréal has the study done for Canada Screen in their permanent collection. It is currently installed in front of the Hôpital Maisonneuve-Rosemont in Montreal. Bursting with diverse elements, it is representative of the artist's desire to set movement within works that convey the transience and the intensity of life. The combination of rays and vertical beams from the study were incorporated into the Expo 67 Canada Screen.

Since the 1980s, Gord Smith has created more than thirty public artworks commissioned by important institutions in Canada and the United States. In 1980, Bell Canada commissioned Gord to create a large-scale bronze sculpture. This sculpture, entitled Icarus, is permanently installed near Albert Campbell Square at the Scarborough Civic Centre. Another monumental piece, Sails, was made of stainless steel and commissioned by George Weston Limited. The abstract piece sits between two flights of steps at the front of Weston Centre (Toronto) and consists of three welded steel panels angled like the sails of a boat experiencing strong winds. The inscription on the sculpture reads "'Tis the set of her sails and not the gales that determines the way she goes".

In 1983, Gord created a trio of bronze pillars entitled Triptych for the A.E. LePage company (now Royal LePage). These three towering jagged-bronze figures now stand just west of the Art Gallery of Windsor in their outdoor sculpture park. The trio have a pegged market value of just over $440,000.  A critic of the Ottawa Citizen wrote in 1977 “It isn’t that the figures are androgynous, but that they evoke images of strength, both male and female. Whoever is fighting to get free of the bronze column is one hell of a fighter.”  

He was assistant professor in the Department of Visual Arts of the University of Victoria from 1972 to 1975. In 1993–94, he assumed a teaching role as visiting professor in the Department of Art and History, McMaster University, Hamilton.

Collections
His work is included in the permanent collections of: 
Montreal Museum of Fine Arts
Confederation Centre Art Gallery
National Gallery of Canada
McGill University
McMaster University
Daytona Beach Community College (now the Southeast Museum of Photography)
Agnes Etherington Art Centre
Montreal Museum of Contemporary Art
Dalhousie University
Carleton University
Art Gallery of Windsor

Honors
1967 - Member of the Royal Canadian Academy of Arts

References

1937 births
Living people
Canadian sculptors
Members of the Royal Canadian Academy of Arts
Artists from Montreal
Academic staff of the University of Victoria